Clare McMeniman (born 11 July 1985), also known as Clare Ferguson, is a former Australia netball international. She captained Australia when they won the 2016 Netball Quad Series and the 2016 Constellation Cup. McMeniman was also a member of the Queensland Firebirds teams that won the 2011, 2015 and  2016 ANZ Championships.

Early life, family and education
McMeniman was raised in Warwick, Queensland. She is the daughter of Geoff and Anne-Maree McMeniman. Her father, a solicitor, died in 2009 and her mother died in 2012. Her older brother, Hugh McMeniman, is a former Australian rugby union international. She was educated at Warwick West State School and John Paul College, Brisbane. She also attended the University of Queensland were she gained a 
Bachelor of Science in 2007 and a Masters of Speech Pathology in 2010. During her playing career she also worked full-time as a speech pathologist at the Princess Alexandra Hospital, Brisbane.

Playing career

AIS Canberra Darters
Between 2004 and 2006, McMeniman played for AIS Canberra Darters in the Commonwealth Bank Trophy league. Her Darters team mates included Laura Geitz. In 2005 she received the league's Best New Talent award.

Queensland Firebirds
Between 2007 and 2016, McMeniman played for Queensland Firebirds, originally in the Commonwealth Bank Trophy league and subsequently in the ANZ Championship. After helping Firebirds win the 2011 ANZ Championship, she initially announced her retirement. However, after missing the 2012 and 2013 seasons, she returned to play for Firebirds in 2014. She subsequently helped Firebirds win two further ANZ Championships in 2015 and  2016. Together with Romelda Aiken and Laura Geitz, McMeniman was one of only three players who featured in all three Championship winning squads.

Australia
McMeniman was a member of the Australia U21 that won a bronze medal at the 2005 World Youth Netball Championships  On 22 October 2014, McMeniman made her senior Australia debut during a Test series against England. Together with Erin Bell, she subsequently co-captained Australia at the 2014 Fast5 Netball World Series. McMeniman was included in an 18-player squad for the 2015 Netball World Cup but missed out on selection when the squad was reduced to 12.

In January 2016 McMeniman captained Australia when they won an away Test series against England. She subsequently captained Australia as they won the 2016 Netball Quad Series. She retired as a netball player after leading Australia to victory in the 2016 Constellation Cup.

Coaching career
In 2014 McMeniman and Laura Geitz established Fuel2Fly, a company organizing netball training sessions and clinics. In 2018 and 2019 McMeniman, now Ferguson, was a member of Lisa Alexander's coaching staff with Australia. In 2020 Ferguson joined Roselee Jencke's coaching staff at Queensland Firebirds.

Honours

Australia
Netball Quad Series
Winners: 2016
Fast5 Netball World Series
Runners Up: 2014
Queensland Firebirds
ANZ Championship
Winners: 2011, 2015, 2016
Individual
Best New Talent
 2005

References

1985 births
Living people
Australian netball players
Australia international netball players
Australia international Fast5 players
Netball players from Queensland
AIS Canberra Darters players
Queensland Firebirds players
ANZ Championship players
Australian netball coaches
University of Queensland alumni
People educated at John Paul College (Brisbane)
People from Warwick, Queensland
Australian netball commentators